Queens Park is a suburb of Perth, Western Australia, located within the City of Canning. Its postcode is 6107.

There are 6,853 persons living in Queens Park. The top five ancestries represented in the suburb were English, Chinese, Australian, Indian, Nepali and Filipino. The majority of persons living in Queens Park were between the ages of 18 and 49 (school leavers, university students, young workforce and parents and home builders).

Pre colonial history 
Queens Park, prior to colonial interactions, was originally cared for by the Whadjuk Noongar people, the traditional owners for the areas along the Canning River. Prior to the colonial settlement of the area, the Canning River and its associated wetlands provided an important source of food and shelter to the Beeliar and Beeloo Noongar people. The Beeloo considered north of the Canning River to the hills as part of their ground while the Beeliar mainly traversed the southern section of the river to the sea. At the time of colonial settlement, Midgegooroo and Munday were leaders of these people. The Cannington-Wilson area was called "Beeloo" for many years by local residents.

Post-colonial history 
The suburb derives its name from the former Queens Park Road Board that was incorporated into the Canning and Belmont Road Boards.

Queens Park was originally known as Woodlupine. The name change was brought about following a murder in 1911. Local residents and authorities feared the incident could jeopardise the development of the area. It was agreed that the name would be changed to Queens Park to honour Queen Alexandra, wife of King Edward VII.

Sister Kate's children's home 
The largest single land-holder in Queens Park was Sister Kate's children's home, which was founded by Katherine Mary Clutterbuck in 1934 and expanded in 1936. At the time, A. O. Neville, the government Chief Protector of Aborigines was the architect of an official scheme that oversaw the care, custody and education of Aboriginal and half-caste children under 16 years in the state.  The scheme's purpose was to integrate young and part-Aboriginal children into white society by separating them from their families. These children later became known as the Stolen Generations.

Whadjuk Noongar heritage sites 
 DAA have site 3633 located on Sevenoaks Street in Queens Park.

Colonial heritage 
 The Chapel of the Guardian Angel
 Sister Kate's Children's Home
 St Josephs Roman Catholic School & Convent
 St Norbert College & St Joseph's Priory
 Cannington Fire Station 
 Coronation Hotel

Modern developments 
Queens Park now incorporates the former suburb of Maniana, once of State Housing development post-WW2, which is being pulled down and redeveloped into "Quatro"..

New developments such as "Skytown" have seen property prices boom as developers buy old houses for unit development, especially around the older parts of Queens Park on Welshpool Road.

Transport 
Queens Park is home to Queens Park railway station. The station is due to be rebuilt in 2023 as part of Metronet. The station is served by 1 bus route, the 201 to Cannington railway station from Curtin University.

Environment 

Queens Park has several open spaces and reserves, including an oval and eleven parks, and one regional park.

Flora includes:
 Flooded gum
 Grass tree
 Bulrushes
 Swamp paperbark

Community groups 
The Friends of Queens Park Bushland is a community group of volunteers whose aim is to help the community connect with nature through protecting, regenerating and revegetating the bushland in Queens Park, East Cannington and Welshpool.

The Lions Club has a branch in Queens Park.

Sports clubs 
The Queens Park Football Club was established in the early 1960s. Currently it has Auskick teams. 

The Queens Park Soccer Club was founded in 1909. Queens Park is home to several men's, women's and junior teams.

Wildlife 
There are 759 wildlife species currently identified. Easily identified and frequently spotted species are:

Birds
 Cormorant 
 Australian pelican
 Little egret
 Australian white ibis

Mammals
 Lesser long-eared bat
 Fox
 House mouse

Reptiles
 Southwestern snake-necked turtle
 Southern blind snake
 Dugite

Amphibians
 Limnodynastes dorsalis
 Moaning frog
 Motorbike frog

Schools 
 Queens Park Primary School
 St Norbert College
 St. Josephs School

See also 
 Queens Park railway station, Perth

References

Suburbs in the City of Canning
Suburbs of Perth, Western Australia